Spaz is a derogatory description that evolved from spastic.

Spaz or spazz may also refer to:

 Spazz (band), an American musical group
 "Spaz" (song), a 2008 single by N.E.R.D.
 "Spaz", a 2019 song by Bhad Bhabie
 Space Pirates and Zombies (S.P.A.Z.), a video game
 Spaz Jackrabbit, a video character from the Jazz Jackrabbit series
 Patrick Spaziante, comic book artist known professionally as "Spaz"
 Steve Williams (animator) (born 1962), Canadian visual effects artist

See also
 Spastic (disambiguation)